The 1995 Pacific Curling Championships were held from December 7 to 10 at the Tokoro Curling Club in Tokoro, Hokkaido, Japan. 

Australia won the men's event over Japan (it was the fifth Pacific title for the Australian men). On the women's side, Japan defeated Australia in the final (it was the fourth Pacific title for the Japanese women).   

By virtue of winning, the Australian men's team and the Japanese women's team qualified for the 1996 World  and  Curling Championships in Hamilton, Ontario, Canada.

Men

Teams

Round robin

 Teams to final

Final

Final standings

Women

Teams

Round robin

 Teams to final

Final

Final standings

References

External links

Pacific Curling Championships, 1995
Pacific-Asia Curling Championships
International curling competitions hosted by Japan
1995 in Japanese sport
Sport in Hokkaido
December 1995 sports events in Asia